Diogo Emanuel Alves Ramos (born 8 November 1986 in Grijó (Vila Nova de Gaia), Porto District) is a Portuguese footballer who plays for Cypriot club Onisilos Sotira 2014 as an attacking midfielder.

References

External links

Cyprus Football Association profile

1986 births
Living people
Sportspeople from Vila Nova de Gaia
Portuguese footballers
Association football midfielders
Liga Portugal 2 players
Segunda Divisão players
Padroense F.C. players
S.C. Freamunde players
Varzim S.C. players
Liga I players
ACF Gloria Bistrița players
Cypriot First Division players
Cypriot Second Division players
Doxa Katokopias FC players
Olympiakos Nicosia players
Karmiotissa FC players
Onisilos Sotira players
Portuguese expatriate footballers
Expatriate footballers in Romania
Expatriate footballers in Cyprus
Portuguese expatriate sportspeople in Romania
Portuguese expatriate sportspeople in Cyprus